Alan or Allan Webster may refer to:

 Alan Webster (rower) (born 1941), former New Zealand rower
 Alan Webster (paedophile) (born 1966), British paedophile prisoner
 Alan Webster (priest) (1918–2007), Anglican priest and dean
Allan Ross Webster, Canadian politician

See also
Allen Webster (disambiguation)